Dame Joanna Angela Smith,  (born 27 April 1968), styled Mrs Justice Smith, is a British High Court judge.

Smith was born in London, England in 1968 and educated at The King's School in Ely. She attended Christ Church, Oxford, matriculating in 1986, and graduated with a first-class MA in jurisprudence.

She was called to the bar at Lincoln's Inn in 1990, practising commercial, professional negligence and construction law from Cornerstone Chambers and Wilberforce Chambers. Smith took silk in 2009 and was appointed a deputy High Court judge in 2017. As a practitioner, she appeared in the 2015 Cavendish Square Holding BV v Talal El Makdessi case before the Supreme Court of the United Kingdom. Prior to her full-time judicial appointment, she took appointments as an arbitrator.

On 15 February 2021, Smith was appointed a judge of the High Court and assigned to the Chancery Division. She received the customary damehood in 2020.

In 1994, she married Mark Vanhegan (a fellow KC) and together they have two daughters.

References 

Living people
1968 births
British women judges
Dames Commander of the Order of the British Empire
Alumni of Christ Church, Oxford
Members of Lincoln's Inn
Chancery Division judges
Lawyers from London
21st-century King's Counsel
English King's Counsel
21st-century English judges
People educated at King's Ely